Andes Airport  is an airport in Andes, Colombia.

References

Airports in Colombia